AllianceBernstein Holding L.P. (AB) is a global asset management firm providing investment management and research services worldwide to institutional, high-net-worth and retail investors.

AllianceBernstein's headquarters are located in Nashville, Tennessee; the firm also has locations throughout the world.

History

Origins 
AllianceBernstein traces its origins back to the founding of Sanford C. Bernstein in 1967 as an investment-management firm for private clients. Sanford C. Bernstein & Company was originally co-founded by Zalman Bernstein, Paul P. Bernstein, Shepard D. Osherow, Roger Hertog and Lewis A. Sanders.

Alliance Capital was founded in 1971 when the investment-management department of Donaldson, Lufkin & Jenrette, Inc. merged with the investment-advisory business of Moody's Investor Services, Inc.

2000–2015 
In October 2000, Alliance Capital acquired Sanford C. Bernstein. Alliance Capital's growth equity and corporate fixed-income investing, and its family of retail mutual funds, accompanied Bernstein's value equity and tax-exempt fixed-income management and its private-client business.

It had approximately US$800 billion assets under management as of the end of 2007.

2015 
On January 20, 2015, AllianceBernstein announced a new brand name ("AB") and logo.

2018 
In February 2018, a senior research analyst of the firm, Paul Gait, defined the Democratic Republic of Congo (DRC)– a country rich in cobalt, which is essential to the lithium-ion batteries that drive electric vehicles –as economically "the Saudi Arabia of the electric vehicle age."

AllianceBernstein and Fidelity Investments took control of supermarket Winn-Dixie's parent company during the latter's 2018 bankruptcy.

AllianceBernstein also have announced the move of their global headquarters and csuite from New York City to Nashville, while also having an office remaining in Midtown in New York City.

2019 
In 2019, AllianceBernstein partnered with Columbia University to provide training courses on sustainability and environmental sciences to its staff of investors.

2020 
In June 2020, AllianceBernstein acquired investment management firm AnchorPath for $400 million.

2021 
In April 2021, AllianceBernstein moved to a new headquarters in Nashville, Tennessee. In September 2021, AllianceBernstein gave a $100,000 gift to the Nashville-based Martha O'Bryan Center.

Columbia University partnered with AllianceBernstein in 2021 . In mid-August 2021, AllianceBernstein disclosed that it had entered a strategic partnership with LSV Advisors, LLC.

2022 
In March 2022, it was announced that AllianceBernstein and AllianceBernstein Holding had acquired the Minneapolis headquartered CarVal Investors — a global private alternatives investment manager.

Organization

Institutional investment management 
AllianceBernstein provides investment services for institutions. Typical clients include Defined benefit pension plans and Defined contribution plans. It has approximately US$498 billion in assets under management as of June 30, 2017.

Retail distribution 
The retail part of AllianceBernstein provides financial professionals and individual investors with investments, research and tools that cover mutual funds, Managed Accounts, College Saving, Retirement Saving, and Insurance Services.

Sell-side research 
Sell-side research and brokerage services are provided by wholly owned subsidiary Sanford C. Bernstein, also known as Bernstein Research.

Private wealth management 
Bernstein Wealth Management, part of AllianceBernstein, provides investment and wealth-planning services for high-net-worth clients in the Americas

529 savings plan 
Rhode Island's 529 savings plan, CollegeBoundfund, was managed by AllianceBernstein and featured AllianceBernstein mutual funds until 2016. It is now administered by Ascensus College Savings.

Headquarters and locations
AllianceBernstein's global headquarters are located in Nashville, TN at the Fifth and Broadway development, having recently moved from Midtown Manhattan in New York City. AllianceBernstein has offices in 46 locations across 22 countries.

Ownership 
AllianceBernstein is 64 percent owned by Equitable Holdings.

See also 
 Group Retirement Plan
 Individual Retirement Account
 Mutual fund
 Standard & Poor's

References

External links 

Financial services companies established in 1967
Companies listed on the New York Stock Exchange
Investment management companies of the United States
Companies based in Nashville, Tennessee
American companies established in 1967
1980s initial public offerings